Dixie Lee is a regional franchised fried chicken fast-food restaurant founded in Belleville, Ontario in 1964 by Ramon Leon Walmsley. The company is currently based in Kingston and Bruce Mines, Ontario. Its largest group of franchise operators is Dixie Lee Maritimes, a New Brunswick-based company with 38 locations in three provinces. The parent organization is the direct franchisor of ten restaurants in various Ontario locations.

History
The first Dixie Lee restaurant opened in 1964 in Belleville, Ontario.

The first Dixie Lee restaurant in New Brunswick opened its door in Caraquet, as a small take-out restaurant just past the wharf.. Following a fire during a winter storm, the restaurant changed locations locally, moving again to a bigger building in the mid-1990s. Other restaurants opened in Grande-Anse, Shippagan, Tracadie-Sheila (one of the first to include a drive-thru option) and then in Lamèque.

In 1974, Alton Scott, built and operated a U.S. location in Houlton, Maine which went bankrupt in 1981. A location franchised in Ogdensburg, New York that opened in 1969 was sold in 2012.

By 1975, the chain claimed "over 101 fried chicken and seafood takeout stores in the U.S. and Canada" and was actively recruiting new franchisees through a U.S. office in Massena, New York. Many of these locations were existing restaurants under local branding who carried Dixie Lee chicken as a sideline.

David Silvester started in the business in 1970 as an owner/operator of a single Dixie Lee outlet in Castlegar, British Columbia. He then acquired a Dixie Lee area franchise for British Columbia where he opened and sold 17 franchises. After developing British Columbia, he bought the Dixie Lee franchise parent company in 1979.  Silvester moved to Dixie Lee's Head Office in Belleville. He was responsible for developing Dixie Lee from eight outlets in Ontario to more than 50 by 1987; he sold the company in January 2006.

In 2006, the chain claimed to be the fourth largest chicken franchise company in Canada with sales in excess of $55 million per year from over 77 restaurants in operation in Canada and the United States. Dixie Lee restaurants were located in Ontario (25 outlets), New Brunswick, British Columbia, Alberta, and Quebec.

In 2006, Joe Murano assumed the management of the company as a president. His previous franchise experience is with Kingston local chains Bandito Video (now defunct) and Papa Pete's pizza. The corporate head office was located in Napanee, Ontario and the company listed by OTC Markets Group as over-the-counter stock Dixie Lee International Industries, Inc (Pink Sheets: DLII).

In January 2006, as Joe Murrano took corporate ownership, by June 2006, Maria Struik and John Struik became entangled in a legal battle with the new corporate owner. In May 2008, John became suddenly ill and was diagnosed with pancreatic cancer; he died in June 2008. Although Maria had always been involved in the business, it was more in a supporting role. After John's death, she honored his previous agreement with Dixie Lee. The legal battle ended in September 2011; however she was left with many ongoing leases. Dixie Lee Food Systems refused to assume these leases, even at no cost, which forced Mrs. Struik to start her own business in the hospitality industry.

With the vesting of all of the Dixie Lee franchisor's rights for the Northern Ontario area, Mrs. Struik is now in charge of eight units in the area. The Dixie Lee units affected by the court order were: Dixie Lee Spanish, Dixie Lee Garson, Dixie Lee Penetanguishene, Dixie Lee Bancroft and Dixie Lee Barry's Bay.

Mrs. Struik was forced to seek the help of the legal system, when, on November 5, 2012, she received communication from the president and owner of Dixie Lee Food System, Mr. Murano, stating that he had suspended the payments due to her under their 2011 Settlement agreement.

Mrs. Struik had sold her area-franchise interest in the Northern Ontario area back to Dixie Lee Food Systems Ltd., a company controlled by Mr. Murano. After Murano defaulted, a court order was handed down on January 22, 2013, which transferred all rights of the franchisor to Mrs. Struik.

In April 2020, the start of the COVID-19 pandemic, the Dixie Lee corporate headquarters sought to help those considered essential workers. Through a phone line, the general public could donate a hero meal served by its franchises.

Dixie Lee International 

One branch opened in Dubai, United Arab Emirates in 2008 but is now closed. A Kyiv, Ukraine location operated briefly in 2008 with plans to establish five restaurants in that country.

Expansion to Manchester, UK was also attempted; the chain predicted locations in China and India would be in operation by the end of 2008.

In 2012, an expansion was attempted into Jamaica. Malaysia and Sri Lanka were also targets for Dixie Lee franchises.

Locations and franchise coverage

In 2014, ten Ontario locations remain in operation, primarily in small markets. Six of these are operated by northern Ontario regional chain Roosters Diner, which also operates restaurants under its own name. With the notable exception of Dixie Lee Maritimes (which remains strong with 38 locations extending from Quebec City, Quebec eastward through New Brunswick and as far the Magdalen Islands), the chain has little remaining presence outside Ontario. A Dixie Lee opened in Oakville, Ontario in 2014 marking its entry into Halton Region.

The outlets located in Eastern Canada are managed by Dixie Lee Maritimes Ltd., while those that remain in other areas of Canada (and formerly the United States) were operated by Dixie Lee Food Systems Ltd.

, Dixie Lee's only international presence is in Guyana, where local businessman Alfro Alphonso opened Dixie Lee and Papa Pete's franchises alongside a US-franchised Miami Subs Grill and a sports bar in Georgetown in September 2013.  There is also a location in Ogdensburg, NY on the border of Ontario and New York State.

Menu and nutrition
Dixie Lee restaurants serve fish and chips, fried chicken, nuggets and other side items such as cole slaw, French fries, wings, wraps and soft drinks.  According to its website, fried products are prepared with trans-fat free oils.

The company's website states that its chicken products may contain trace amount of MSG and that other products may contain allergens and ingredients that may cause sensitivity to some persons.

See also
 List of fast-food chicken restaurants

References

Restaurants established in 1964
Fast-food chains of Canada
Fast-food franchises
Fast-food poultry restaurants
Companies based in Kingston, Ontario